"Cinderella" is a song performed by Australian recording duo Shakaya for their debut album Shakaya (2002). The song was released as the album's third and final single on 30 September 2002. It was written by Vincent DeGiorgio, Rebecca Hortlund, Mikael Lundh, George Samuelson and Quint Starkie and produced by Patrick Crowley, Reno Nicastro and Khesrow Rasta.

Track listing
CD single
 "Cinderella" (Radio Edit) – 3:33
 "Cinderella" (Vocal Remix) – 3:40
 "Cinderella" (NRG Mix) – 5:57
 "Sublime" (Hess Bamboo Mix) – 7:38
 "What I Want" – 3:33
 "Good Times" – 3:44

In popular culture
 The song features in episodes three and four of "We Can Be Heroes: Finding The Australian of the Year" (2005).

Charts

Certifications

Release history

References

Songs based on fairy tales
2002 singles
Shakaya songs
2002 songs
Songs written by Vincent DeGiorgio